The Layla Sessions: 20th Anniversary Edition (or The Layla Sessions) released September 1990 is an anniversary remix of the 1970 Layla and Other Assorted Love Songs album by Derek and the Dominos. The album contains the original album, remixed to improve audio quality, and, in the 3-CD edition, two extra discs of unused alternate and incomplete masters of the original songs and studio jamming. The box set was designed by Mitchell Kanner.

Critical reception 

Reviewing in October 1990, Ira Robbins of Rolling Stone said the original album has "aged gracefully", but found the rest inferior, including some of the "intriguing" outtakes. Robert Christgau was more critical in The Village Voice, questioning the value and purpose of the box set. While most fulfill marketing rather than musical purposes, The Layla Sessions is especially suspicious, in his opinion:

Track listing

Disc one: Layla And Other Assorted Love Songs (Remixed Version) 
 "I Looked Away" (Eric Clapton, Bobby Whitlock)  Recorded September 2, 1970.  Overdubbed September 2 & 4, 1970
 "Bell Bottom Blues" (Clapton)  Recorded September 2, 1970.  Overdubbed September 4 & 9, 1970
 "Keep on Growing" (Clapton, Whitlock)  Recorded September 1, 1970.  Overdubbed September 1,2,5 & 9, 1970
 "Nobody Knows You When You're Down and Out" (Jimmy Cox)  Recorded August 31, 1970.
 "I Am Yours" (Clapton, Nizami)  Recorded September 3, 1970.  Overdubbed September 4 & 9, 1970
 "Anyday" (Clapton, Whitlock)  Recorded September 3, 1970.  Overdubbed September 4, 1970
 "Key to the Highway" (Charles Segar, Willie Broonzy)  Recorded August 30, 1970.
 "Tell the Truth" (Clapton, Whitlock)  Recorded August 28, 1970.  Overdubbed September 1 & 4, 1970
 "Why Does Love Got to Be So Sad?" (Clapton, Whitlock)  Recorded August 31, 1970.  Overdubbed September 1 & 9, 1970
 "Have You Ever Loved a Woman" (Billy Myles)  Recorded September 2, 1970.
 "Little Wing" (Jimi Hendrix)  Recorded September 9, 1970.
 "It's Too Late" (Chuck Willis)  Recorded September 3, 1970.  Overdubbed September 9 & October 1, 1970
 "Layla" (Clapton, Jim Gordon)  Recorded September 9, 1970.  Overdubbed October 1, 1970
 "Thorn Tree in the Garden" (Whitlock)  Recorded September 10, 1970.

Disc two: The Jams 
 "Jam I" (Clapton, Gordon, Carl Radle, Whitlock)  Recorded September 2, 1970
 "Jam II" (Clapton, Gordon, Radle, Whitlock)  Recorded August 26, 1970
 "Jam III" (Clapton, Gordon, Radle, Whitlock)  Recorded August 27, 1970
 "Jam IV" (Duane Allman, Gregg Allman, Dickey Betts, Berry Oakley, Butch Trucks, Clapton, Whitlock)  Recorded August 27, 1970
 "Jam V" (Duane Allman, Clapton, Gordon, Radle, Whitlock)  Recorded August 27, 1970

Disc three: Alternate Masters, Jams And Outtakes 
 "Have You Ever Loved a Woman (Alternate Master #1)" (Myles)  Recorded August 31, 1970
 "Have You Ever Loved a Woman (Alternate Master #2)" (Myles)  Recorded August 26, 1970
 "Tell the Truth (Jam #1)" (Clapton, Whitlock)  Recorded August 27, 1970
 "Tell the Truth (Jam #2)" (Clapton, Whitlock)  Recorded August 27, 1970
 "Mean Old World (Rehearsal)" (Little Walter)  Recorded October 2, 1970
 "Mean Old World (Band Version, Master Take)" (Little Walter)  Recorded October 2, 1970
 "Mean Old World (Duet Version, Master Take)" (Little Walter)  Recorded October 2, 1970
 "(When Things Go Wrong) It Hurts Me Too (Jam)" (Trad., arr. Mel London)  Recorded August 27, 1970
 "Tender Love (Incomplete Master)" (Clapton, Whitlock)  Recorded August 27, 1970
 "It's Too Late (Alternate Master)" (Willis)  Recorded September 9, 1970

References

Derek and the Dominos compilation albums
Albums produced by Tom Dowd
1990 compilation albums
Polydor Records compilation albums
Reissue albums